Arumugampillai Coomaraswamy (1783 – 7 November 1836) was a Ceylon Tamil member of the Legislative Council of Ceylon.

Early life and family

Coomaraswamy was born in 1783 in Garudavil near Point Pedro in northern Ceylon. He was the son of Arumugampillai.

Coomaraswamy married Visalachchi. They had a son (Muthu Coomaraswamy) and a daughter (Sellachi). Coomaraswamy was the grandfather of four eminent Ceylon Tamils: Ananda Coomaraswamy, P. Coomaraswamy, P. Ramanathan and P. Arunachalam.

Career
Coomaraswamy was appointed Mudaliyar of the Governor's Gate in 1805. He was personal officer to Governor Brownrigg between 1812 and 1822. He also served governors Paget and Barnes.

When the Legislative Council of Ceylon was established in 1833 Coomaraswamy was appointed as the unofficial member representing Tamils.

Coomaraswamy died on 7 November 1836.

References

1783 births
1836 deaths
A
Gate Mudaliyars
Members of the Legislative Council of Ceylon
People from Manipay
People from British Ceylon
Sri Lankan Tamil politicians